I'm OK may refer to:

 I'm OK (album), a 1999 album by David Tao
 "I'm OK" (Little Big song), 2019
 I'm OK, You're OK (album), a 2007 album Jason Falkner
 I'm OK – You're OK, a 1967 self-help book by psychiatrist Thomas Anthony Harris
 I'm O.K – A Murder Simulator, a 2006 video game
 "I'm OK", a song by Christina Aguilera from the 2002 album Stripped